The women's 400 metres hurdles event at the 1981 Summer Universiade was held at the Stadionul Naţional in Bucharest on 24 and 25 July 1981. It was the first time that this event was contested by women at the Universiade.

Medalists

Results

Heats

Final

References

Athletics at the 1981 Summer Universiade
1981